The 10th constituency of the Hauts-de-Seine is a French legislative constituency in the Hauts-de-Seine département.

Description

Hauts-de-Seine's 10th constituency covers the area to the south of Boulogne-Billancourt bordered to the north by the Seine and to the south by the Paris–Brest railway. The seat forms part of the wealthy suburbs just to the west of Paris.

On 16 October 2018, Gabriel Attal was appointed Secretary of State to the Minister of National Education and Youth in the Second Philippe government. He was replaced by his substitute, Florence Provendier on 17 November 2018.

Historic Representative

Election results

2022

 
 
 
 
 
 
 
|-
| colspan="8" bgcolor="#E9E9E9"|
|-

2017

 
 
 
 
 
 
 
|-
| colspan="8" bgcolor="#E9E9E9"|
|-

2012

 
 
 
 
 
 
|-
| colspan="8" bgcolor="#E9E9E9"|
|-

2007

 
 
 
 
 
 
|-
| colspan="8" bgcolor="#E9E9E9"|
|-

2002

 
 
 
 
 
 
|-
| colspan="8" bgcolor="#E9E9E9"|
|-

1997

 
 
 
 
 
 
 
 
|-
| colspan="8" bgcolor="#E9E9E9"|
|-

Sources

 Official results of French elections from 1998: 

 

 

 

10